Flaianus (in office 883–885) was a medieval Galician clergyman.

References
 Consello da Cultura Galega (ed.), Documentos da Catedral de Lugo, (Santiago de Compostela, 1998)

9th-century Galician bishops
885 deaths